This is a list of the England women's national football team results and scheduled fixtures from 2020 to the present.

Results

2020

2021

2022

2023

References

2020s in England
2020s